Helicops infrataeniatus is a species of snake in the family Colubridae. It is found in South America especially in the south of Brazil, Uruguay, Argentina and Paraguay.

References 

Helicops
Snakes of South America
Reptiles of Brazil
Reptiles of Paraguay
Reptiles of Uruguay
Reptiles described in 1865
Taxa named by Giorgio Jan